The following lists events that happened during 1951 in the Belgian Congo.

Incumbent
Governor-general – Eugène Jungers

Events

See also

 Belgian Congo
 History of the Democratic Republic of the Congo

References

Sources

 
Belgian Congo
Belgian Congo